The following is an incomplete list of urban settlements, towns, new towns (satellite towns) in Hong Kong. 

While the Government of Hong Kong is unitary and Hong Kong law does not define cities and towns as subsidiary administrative units, the geographical limits of the City of Victoria, Kowloon and New Kowloon are defined in law. None of these three areas have administrative authorities separate from the Special Administrative Region. Administratively, Hong Kong is divided into districts, the boundaries of which are drawn according to mountains, coastlines and roads, and do not coincide with the natural extents of any urbanised areas.

Major urban settlements

New towns

Towns

Largest urban agglomerations
 Kowloon - 2,019,500
 Northern Hong Kong Island - 992,900
 Tsuen Wan New Town - 801,800
 Sha Tin New Town - 630,000
 Tuen Mun New Town - 470,900
 Tseung Kwan O New Town - 344,500
 Aberdeen - 275,100
 Tai Po New Town - 274,000
 Tin Shui Wai New Town - 268,800
 Fanling-Sheung Shui New Town - 244,700
 Yuen Long New Town - 141,900
 North Lantau New Town - 71,900

See also
 Districts of Hong Kong
 List of largest cities 
 List of places in Hong Kong
 List of streets and roads in Hong Kong
 List of villages in Hong Kong

Cities and towns in Hong Kong
Hong Kong